Indika Sanjeewa Gallage (born 22 November 1975), or Indika Gallage, is a former Sri Lankan cricketer who played in one Test match and three One Day Internationals from 1999 to 2001. He is a right-handed batsman and a right-arm medium-fast bowler.

International career
He has represented Sri Lanka at every level from Under-13s onward. In 1998 he toured with Sri Lanka in England. In 1999 he had a surprising year, in which, following his Commonwealth Games exploits in Kuala Lumpur the previous year, he played in Australia, Sharjah (in the Coca-Cola trophy) and Bulawayo, Zimbabwe, where he made his Test debut for his country.

After cricket
He has now become an Australian citizen. He is an active club cricketer in Melbourne. He got married and has two boys and a daughter.

References

1975 births
Living people
Sri Lanka One Day International cricketers
Sri Lanka Test cricketers
Sri Lankan cricketers
Cricketers at the 1998 Commonwealth Games
Panadura Sports Club cricketers
Colombo Cricket Club cricketers
Ruhuna cricketers
Commonwealth Games competitors for Sri Lanka